Lady Isobel Constance Mary Gathorne-Hardy  (September 2, 1875 – December 30, 1963) was a British courtier, best known for helping to popularize ice hockey in the early days of the sport in Canada. The daughter of Lord Stanley of Preston, former Governor General of Canada, and Lady Constance Villiers, she was one of the earliest European women known to have played the sport. Today, she is celebrated as an early pioneer of women's ice hockey and the championship trophy of the Premier Hockey Federation (PHF) is called the Isobel Cup in her honor.

Personal life
Lady Isobel Stanley was the second-youngest of ten children born to Frederick Stanley, 16th Earl of Derby and Constance Villiers. Two of her siblings died before Isobel was born: Geoffrey, Arthur's twin, died on 16 March 1871 and her elder sister, Katherine Mary, died young in October of the same year. Isobel Stanley grew up in an active environment with her seven brothers. 

In 1897, she married General Sir (John) Francis Gathorne-Hardy, a younger son of John Gathorne-Hardy, 2nd Earl of Cranbrook and Cicely Ridgway. She retained her title upon marriage as the daughter of an earl and took on the family name of her husband, being styled Lady Gathorne-Hardy. They had one child, a daughter named Elizabeth Constance Mary Gathorne-Hardy (1904–1953). 

Lady Gathorne-Hardy served in the Royal Household as a Woman of the Bedchamber to Queen Mary during 1914 to 1920. In 1945, King George VI appointed her Dame Commander of the Royal Victorian Order for her service to the royal family.

Ice hockey

Stanley shared her father's and brothers' love of the game of ice hockey and was instrumental in convincing her father to create the Stanley Cup. Stanley played hockey while she was in Canada, playing on the outdoor rink at Rideau Hall. After the opening of the Rideau Skating Rink, she organized one of the first games of women's hockey on record in 1890.

Isobel Gathorne-Hardy Award
Lady Isobel Stanley Gathorne-Hardy's role as a pioneer of women's ice hockey in Canada is acknowledged with the Isobel Gathorne-Hardy Award. The award is presented by Hockey Canada to an active player (at any level) whose values, leadership and personal traits are representative of all female athletes.

Isobel Cup

The championship trophy of the Premier Hockey Federation (PHF) is called the Isobel Cup in her honor.

References

1875 births
1963 deaths
Canadian women's ice hockey players
Isobel
Daughters of British earls
Women of the Bedchamber
Dames Commander of the Royal Victorian Order
Wives of knights